Songs About Jane is the debut studio album by American pop rock band Maroon 5. The album was released on June 25, 2002, by Octone and J Records. It became a sleeper hit with the help of five singles that attained chart success, including "Harder to Breathe", "This Love", and "She Will Be Loved".

The album was re-released on October 14, 2003, becoming a huge international commercial success, while garnering a generally positive critical reception. It topped the album charts in Australia, France, New Zealand, the Republic of Ireland and the United Kingdom, and reached the top-ten in 17 other countries. At the end of 2004, the album reached the top-ten of the US Billboard 200 chart. It had sold nearly 2.7 million copies by the end of 2004, and over 5.1 million copies in the U.S. by August 2015. It has sold over 10 million copies worldwide as of 2007.

On June 5, 2012, the band released the album's 10th anniversary edition, to coincide with their fourth studio album Overexposed. This is their only album to feature the original drummer Ryan Dusick.

Background
All but one member of the band had been members of a previous Los Angeles band called Kara's Flowers which released an album called The Fourth World in mid-1997 on Reprise Records with little success. Kara's Flowers left Reprise Records in 1999, and with the addition of guitarist James Valentine became Maroon 5.

The band played showcase gigs in New York City and Los Angeles. Singer and guitarist Adam Levine credited the interim with influencing the band's new style in an interview with VH1. "During the time between our record deals, I spent a lot of time in New York where I was exposed to an urban and hip-hop culture in a way that had never happened to me in L.A. It turned me on to an entirely new genre of music which has had a profound impact on my song writing."

The band signed with Octone Records, a New York independent label with distribution through BMG and an artist development deal with Clive Davis' J Records. The band recorded Songs About Jane at Rumbo Recorders in Los Angeles with producer Matt Wallace, who had also produced with Train, Faith No More, and O.A.R. Production was handled primarily by Wallace, with Mark Endert mixing with additional production for "This Love".

Eight of the songs on the album were either written or co-written by Levine and keyboardist Jesse Carmichael, while the former was living in New York. Many of the lyrics for the album are inspired by Levine's relationship with his ex-girlfriend, Jane Herman. Levine notes, "I saw this girl at a gas station, and I fell in love with her," he says. "I wrote a song about her and played it in the store where she worked. It was an awful song. But she found out about this relatively psychotic boy. She was my muse for years. . . . And then it kind of faded away." Levine also confirmed this, saying there was at least one line in every song about her.

Release and reception

The album has been released with the Copy Control protection system in some regions. After the release of the album in mid-2002, the band toured with Michelle Branch and Nikka Costa. They also toured with Matchbox Twenty and Sugar Ray during some of their shows in 2003. In March 2004, the album had reached the top 20 of the Billboard 200, and had reached the top 10 by the end of the year. Songs About Jane also eventually topped the UK and Australian album charts. Songs About Jane was the seventh best-selling album of 2004 in the U.S., with about 2.7 million copies sold. In Australia, the album did not chart on the End of Year Charts until 2004, where it reached No. 6. After constant touring, three years after the release of Songs About Jane, it received a Grammy for Best New Artist. The album reached 5.1 million sales in the United States in August 2015.

The album was generally well received by music critics. Christian Hoard of Rolling Stone praised the album for its "vaguely funky white-soul stylings, tunefulness and vocals" and mentioned "Must Get Out" and "This Love" as the album's standout tracks. AllMusic's MacKenzie Wilson called the album an "impressive rebirth" from Kara's Flowers' "indie outfit", stating: "Songs About Jane is love-drunk on what makes Maroon 5 tick as a band ... they've got grit and a sexy strut, personally and musically." Caroline Sullivan of The Guardian commented that the album "isn't as useless as one would hope ... Songs About Jane is pitched at the Busted market, for which their guitar-mashing and surging harmonies eminently qualify them." In The Village Voice, Mikael Wood wrote that while Adam Levine's "sexual politics occasionally lapse into casual senior-year cruelty", he "more often than not complicates the situation encouragingly." PopMatterss Jason Thompson, however, panned the album, criticizing Levine's likeness to Jay Kay of Jamiroquai. Calling the album "limp at best", he further added: "There's simply nothing here to get excited about. And what about that soul that these guys are boasting about, anyway?".

Songs
According to Billboard, as of 2022, Songs About Jane is one of the 15 best-performing 21st-century albums without any of its singles being number-one hits on the Billboard Hot 100.

The opening track and first single, "Harder to Breathe", released a month after the album released, slowly started to pick up airplay which helped spur sales of the album. "Harder to Breathe" also made the top 20 of the Billboard Hot 100 singles charts and the singles charts in the United Kingdom, Australia and New Zealand. In an interview with MTV News in August 2002, Maroon 5 vocalist Adam Levine, when asked behind the development of "Harder to Breathe", admitted that the song describes the band's frustration with their label, Octone Records, during the making of their debut album. The band thought they had enough material for a release, but when the label told them to keep writing, Levine wrote this song in frustration at the pressure. "That song comes sheerly [sic] from wanting to throw something. It was the 11th hour, and the label wanted more songs. It was the last crack. I was just pissed. I wanted to make a record and the label was applying a lot of pressure, but I'm glad they did."

The second track, "This Love", was also the second single from the album. It won the band their first Grammy Award, for Best Pop Performance by a Duo or Group with Vocals at the 2006 Grammy Awards. In March 2004, two years after being released, the song reached the top 10 of the Australian and United States singles charts. The single's accompanying music video proved to be popular as well, but had to be edited from its original version to avoid being banned from MTV. In an interview, Levine revealed that the song was written in the "most emotionally trying time" in his life. He also added, "I was in a relationship that was ending, but I was really excited on the other end because the band was about to go make the record and I was ecstatic to go in the studio. She was literally leaving town within days of me writing the lyrics to 'This Love', so I was in prime emotional condition to write a song with that kind of conflict."

"She Will Be Loved", the fourth track and third single from the album, also reached similar chart success as the band's previous hits, hitting No. 1 on the Mainstream Top 40 and Adult Top 40 charts, and topping the Australian and Belgian charts and peaking at No. 5 in the United States, the same chart position of previous single and breakthrough hit, "This Love". The song prompted many alternative radio outlets to remove Maroon 5 from their playlists, on the ground that the band's newer songs were too light for alt-rock audiences. These stations continued to play "Harder to Breathe" and "This Love", but Maroon 5's newer hits were played only on pop and adult contemporary stations. As of June 2014, the song has sold more than 3.5 million copies in the United States.

The fifth track, "Tangled", was another song about a broken relationship. But instead of from the point of view of the abused, it's from the abuser. Levine was confessing about certain things that he's done in his love life that he may have regretted. Writers from Billboard rated the song low on their ranking of the album, saying "While 'Tangled' follows a similar formula to several Jane highlights, the energy here falls short, and could use some of the album's more poppier inflections... The intention is there, but the execution falls flat." Though it wasn't all negative, with some positive views: "Levine does hit some soaring notes as he sings lyrics of regret; so don’t be surprised if you catch yourself mouthing the words."

"Must Get Out" was the fifth and final single released from the album. Like many songs on the album, it was written by band members Adam Levine and Jesse Carmichael, while production and mixing was done by Matt Wallace. The band's guitarist James Valentine explained that the downtempo song emulates Andy Summers and The Police. Lyrically, "Must Get Out" expresses a tough period of a relationship, with a dreamy lyrical story, where the band "offers up clever imagery with 'I've been the needle and thread/Weaving figures eights and circles 'round your head' and frank confessions to today's problems, 'The city's made us crazy and we must get out'." The single failed to chart in the US, but made the Top 30 in the United Kingdom, Ireland and New Zealand.

"Sunday Morning" was released as the fourth single. It did not reach the chart success of the previous singles, but nevertheless became a hit song and garnered positive reviews from critics. Although the song only peaked at number 31 in the US, it topped the charts in Belgium and reached the top forty in Australia, Hungary, Ireland, the Netherlands, New Zealand, South Korea, and the UK. It was reported that this song was the one that got the band signed to Octone Records, with its executive Ben Berkman calling it "genius". Unlike many other songs on the album, the relationship Levine describes isn’t full of the pain that’s echoed through the rest of the album. Instead, it captures the sweet and tender moments that can outweigh the bad, like waking up next to the one you love on a cold, rainy day.

Outtakes
Two songs that did not make the cut for the album did release eventually, with "Woman" appearing on the Spider-Man 2 soundtrack, and "Wasted Years", appearing on the live album Live – Friday the 13th and the deluxe edition of Overexposed. A demo version of "Woman" appeared from the album's 10th anniversary edition, was featured on the 2013 Victoria's Secret swimwear video.

Track listing
All songs written by Adam Levine and Jesse Carmichael, except where noted. All songs produced by Matt Wallace, except where noted.

Personnel
Credits for Songs About Jane adapted from AllMusic and the album's liner notes.  

Maroon 5
 Adam Levine – lead vocals, rhythm guitar
 Ryan Dusick – drums, backing vocals
 Jesse Carmichael – keyboards, backing vocals
 James Valentine – lead guitar
 Mickey Madden – bass guitar

Session Musicians
 Bruce Smith – programming (tracks 1, 5)
 John O'Brien – programming (tracks 3, 8)
 Sam Farrar – programming (track 4)
 Rashida Jones – backing vocals (tracks 5, 9, 11)
 Mystic – backing vocals (track 8)
 Mark K. Schoenecker – horns (track 8)

Production
 Matt Wallace – production, mixing
 Mark Endert – additional production and mixing (track 2)
 Michael Barbiero – mixing (track 1)
 Mike Landolt – engineer
 Posie Muliadi – assistant engineer
 Danny Wright – assistant engineer
 Leon Zervos – mastering
 Cey Adams – art direction
 Gregg Gordon – illustrations
 Bobby Carmichael – photography
 Chris McCann – photography
 Neil Zlozower – photography

Other Personal
 Jordan Feldstein - management
 Ben Berkman - A&R
 Jeff Worob - legal
 Richard Feldstein - business legal
 Carol Kinzel - booking agency
 Brian Manning - booking agency
 Matt Waldstein - Mangement Consultant:

Charts

Weekly charts

Year-end charts

Decade-end charts

Certifications

Release history

References

External links

Songs About Jane at Discogs

2002 debut albums
J Records albums
Maroon 5 albums
Albums produced by Matt Wallace
Albums produced by Mark Endert
Albums produced by Russ Kunkel
A&M Octone Records albums